The geology of Armenia was shaped by geological upheaval pushed up the Earth's crust to form the Armenian Plateau 25 million years ago. This created the complex topography of Armenia.

The Lesser Caucasus range extends through northern Armenia, runs southeast between Lake Sevan and Azerbaijan, then passes roughly along the Armenian-Azerbaijani border to Iran. Thus situated, the mountains make travel from north to south difficult.

Earthquakes
Geological turmoil continues in the form of devastating earthquakes. In a December 1988 earthquake, the second largest city in the republic, Gyumri (then called Leninakan), was heavily damaged by a massive quake that killed more than 25,000 people.

Terrain

About half of Armenia's area of approximately  has an elevation of at least , and only 3% of the country lies below . To the southwest of the range is the Armenian Plateau, which slopes southwestward toward the Araks River on the Turkish border. The plateau is masked by intermediate mountain ranges and extinct volcanoes. Most of the population lives in the western and northwestern parts of the country, where the two major cities, Yerevan and Gyumri (previously called Aleksandropol during the Soviet period), are located.

The valleys of the Debet River and Akstafa River as they pass through mountain areas form the chief routes into Armenia from the north.

Armenia's terrain is most rugged in the extreme southeast, which is drained by the Bargushat River and most moderate in the Araks River valley to the extreme southwest. Most of Armenia is drained by the Araks or its tributary, the Hrazdan, which flow from Lake Sevan. The Araks forms most of Armenia's border with Turkey and Iran, while the Zangezur Mountains form the border between Armenia's southern province of Syunik and Azerbaijan's adjacent Nakhchivan autonomous region.

Volcanic mountains

Volcanic mountains in Armenia include Mount Ara, Mount Aragats, Azhdahak, Ghegam Ridge, Mount of Armenia. Porak. Arpi Gorge and Garni Gorge contain columnar igneous rocks (Columnar jointing).

Mining

Mines in Armenia include Kajaran Mine and Teghut Mine. Both are open pit mines for copper and molybdenum.

Fossils

See also
 Climate of Armenia
 Geography of Armenia
 Geology of Europe
 Regions of Armenia

References